HK Vitebsk is an ice hockey team in Vitebsk, Belarus. The team competes in the Belarusian Extraliga (BXL).

External links
Official website

Ice hockey teams in Belarus
Eastern European Hockey League teams
Belarusian Extraleague teams